The Mercury Messenger is a concept car that was created by Mercury in 2003. It was revealed at the North American International Auto Show in Detroit that year. The vehicle was named after Mercury, the Roman messenger god from whom Mercury gets its name.

It features a 4.6 liter DOHC V8 mated to a 6-speed automatic sequential gearbox.

External links
 Mercury Messenger at Seriouswheels (archived)

Concept cars
Mercury vehicles